Hibernia is the second solo album by Irish violinist Mairead Nesbitt. The album was recorded in 2016 at Windmill Lane Studios and Soundscape Studio in Dublin, Ireland, following Nesbitt's leave from Celtic Woman. It was produced by Nesbitt and Colm Ó Foghlú.

The album is predominantly instrumental, featuring Nesbitt playing violin with the backing of an orchestra. Some of the tracks include percussive dancing. The track "To Bring Them Home" is the only track to feature vocals. The tracks are a blend of traditional Irish and classical styles "inspired by the music and dance from the southern province of Munster."

Track listing 

Notes

Some of the album tracks were grouped into suites:
 Invasion Suite: tracks 1-3
 Hibernia Suite: tracks 4-7
 Raining Up Suite: tracks 9-11
 The Dusk & The Dark & The Dawn Suite: tracks 13-15

Personnel 
Per the liner notes.

Máiréad Nesbitt – violin, composer
Colm Ó Foghlú – composer, mastering
Karl Nesbitt –  trumpet, low whistle, bouzouki, didjeridoo
Mick O'Brien – ulleann pipes, whistle
Kathleen Nesbitt – fiddle
John Nesbitt – accordion
Seán Nesbitt – accordion
Nathan Pacheco – vocal
Noel Eccles – percussion
Nick Bailey – percussion
Brian Masterson – engineering
Carolin Nesbitt (Willow Studio) – artwork
Lili Forberg – photography

Cashel Set Dancers
 Gráinne Uí Chaomhánaigh
 Áine Cody
 Bernie Sullivan
 Coleman Lydon

The Orchestra of Ireland
 Kenneth Rice – leader
 Liam Bates – conductor

Charts

References 

2016 albums
Máiréad Nesbitt albums